Zhongshan Park station may refer to:

 Zhongshan Park station (Shanghai Metro), a station on the Shanghai Metro in Shanghai
 Zhongshan Park station (Wuhan Metro), a station on the Wuhan Metro in Wuhan, Hubei
 Zhongshan Park station (Qingdao Metro), a station on the Qingdao Metro in Shinan District, Qingdao
 , a station on the Xiamen Metro in Siming District, Xiamen
 Zhongshan Park station (Shenzhen Metro), a station on the Shenzhen Metro in Shenzhen

See also
 Nakayama Station (disambiguation)
 Zhongshan Station (disambiguation)
 Zhongshan (disambiguation)